Felix Jacoby (19 March 1876 – 10 November 1959) was a German classicist and philologist. He is best known among classicists for his highly important work Fragmente der griechischen Historiker, a collection of text fragments of ancient Greek historians.

Biography
Jacoby was born in Magdeburg to Jewish parents. There he attended the grammar school at the monastery of Unser Lieben Frauen (Our Dear Lady) in Magdeburg and was baptised a Protestant in St John's Church at the age of 11.

From 1906 to 1934, he was professor of Classics at Kiel. Though he was later expelled from the University of Kiel during the Gleichschaltung of Nazi Germany, Jacoby is said by some to have been one of a very small number of German Jews who initially supported Adolf Hitler. According to some witnesses, he even went so far as to make the startling comparison in 1933:

As a Jew I find myself in a difficult position. But as a historian I have long learned not to view historical events from a private perspective. I have voted for Adolf Hitler since 1927 and I am happy that in the year of the National Rising I am allowed to lecture on Augustus, because Augustus is the only figure in world history that may be compared to Adolf Hitler.

However, others doubt that this is true. In 1939, Jacoby fled to England, where he stayed at Oxford, continuing his work on the fragments of the Greek historians. He returned to Germany in 1956, and died in Berlin in 1959.

He is best known among classicists for his highly important work Fragmente der griechischen Historiker, a collection of text fragments of ancient Greek historians.  Also significant is his long entry in the Realencyclopädie der Classischen Altertumswissenschaft on the Greek historian Herodotus; written in 1913, this article established many of the questions that would come to dominate modern Herodotean scholarship.

Bibliography
 Carmine Ampolo (ed.): Aspetti dell’ opera di Felix Jacoby. Pisa 2006.
 Eckart Mensching: "Finkenkrug, Neuseeland und Oxford. Über Felix Jacoby und seine Familie 1938/39." In: Eckart Mensching (ed.): Nugae zur Philologie-Geschichte. Berlin 2003, pp. 42–53. 
 Willy Theiler: "Nachruf auf Felix Jacoby." In: Gnomon 32, 1960, pp. 387–391.
 Annegret Wittram: Fragmenta. Felix Jacoby und Kiel. Ein Beitrag zur Geschichte der Kieler Christian-Albrechts-Universität. Frankfurt am Main 2004.

References

20th-century German historians
Jewish emigrants from Nazi Germany to the United Kingdom
German philologists
German male non-fiction writers
Jewish historians
Converts to Christianity from Judaism
Hellenists
Academic staff of the University of Kiel
Members of the Prussian Academy of Sciences
Members of the German Academy of Sciences at Berlin
1876 births
1959 deaths
Writers from Magdeburg
People from the Province of Saxony
Corresponding Fellows of the British Academy